Tiger penis soup is a Chinese soup prepared with tiger penis. It is typically an expensive dish, due to the rarity of tiger penis. In some cultures and countries, people believe that the dish can enhance male virility—a notion that has not been supported by scientific evidence. There has been opposition to the dish from environmental organizations, and ongoing consumption of the soup has contributed to the decline of tiger populations. The legality of the dish varies in different countries, as tigers are a protected species.

Overview
Preparation involves soaking dried tiger penis in water and then cooking it along with other medicines and spices. Sometimes tiger bone is also included in the soup's preparation. Tiger penis soup has been sold for US$300 a bowl in China and other places in the Orient, and can cost as much as US$400. In 1998 in Southeast Asian and East Asian markets, the soup sold for US$350 per bowl. Prices are expensive due to the rarity of tiger penis. Chris Coggins reported in 2002 that the dish was available and had been consumed in various Chinatowns.

Medicinal beliefs
Some people and cultures in Asia believe that tiger penis soup acts as a medicinal aphrodisiac, can improve one's sexual performance or virility, or cure impotence. However, consumption of cooked animal genitalia does not increase testosterone levels in humans. Furthermore, there is no empirical evidence of tiger penis being correlated with sexual enhancement in humans. It has been stated that men may be fooled into thinking their sexual prowess is increased by consuming tiger penis soup due to placebo effects, in which the placebo effects act to counteract mild impotence, rather than the soup.

Opposition
In 1996, the Wildlife Conservation Society, an organization that focuses upon wildlife conservation, ran an international advertising campaign stating that claims of sexual potency being enhanced from consuming tiger penis soup are fraudulent. It has been stated that beliefs of tiger penis soup contributing to sexual enhancement has contributed to the endangerment of tiger populations, because of tiger poaching that occurs due to the high prices penises and other animal parts  can command. Additionally, a high demand for tiger penis soup has significantly contributed to reductions in tiger populations.

Legality
Tigers are an endangered, protected species. It is illegal in some countries to consume tiger, and it has been stated that consumption of tiger is unethical due to the animal's endangered status. Some shops in China and Hong Kong may sell deer or ox tendons while claiming that they are selling tiger penis.

See also

 List of soups

References

Further reading
 Sex, Time, and Power: How Women's Sexuality Shaped Human Evolution – Leonard Shlain. p. 114.

External links
 Aphrodisiacs and the Myth of Tiger Penis Magical Cures. Tigerhomes.org.

Chinese soups
Mammal penis
Traditional Chinese medicine